Kosmos 335 ( meaning Cosmos 335), also known as DS-U1-R No.1, was a Soviet satellite which was launched in 1970 as part of the Dnepropetrovsk Sputnik programme. It was a  spacecraft, which was built by the Yuzhnoye Design Bureau, and was used to study spectral ranges in the Earth's atmosphere.

Launch 
A Kosmos-2I 63SM carrier rocket was used to launch Kosmos 335 into orbit. The launch took place from Site 86/4 at Kapustin Yar. The launch occurred at 22:24:48 UTC on 24 April 1970, and resulted in the successfully insertion of the satellite into low Earth orbit. Upon reaching orbit, the satellite was assigned its Kosmos designation, and received the International Designator 1970-035A. The North American Aerospace Defense Command assigned it the catalogue number 04380.

Orbit 
Kosmos 335 was one of the DS-U1-R satellites. It completed operations on 20 June 1970. On 22 June 1970, it decayed from orbit and reentered the atmosphere.

References

Kosmos satellites
Spacecraft launched in 1970
1970 in the Soviet Union
Dnepropetrovsk Sputnik program